An integrated amplifier (pre/main amp) is an electronic device containing an audio preamplifier and power amplifier in one unit, as opposed to separating the two. Most modern audio amplifiers are integrated and have several inputs for devices such as CD players, DVD players, and auxiliary sources.

Integrated amplifiers commonly had dedicated inputs for turntables, AM/FM tuner, and tape recorders (cassette or reel-to-reel) back when those devices were more common. Except for the turntable, all of the inputs are line level, thus, they are interchangeable.  The turntable also uses RIAA equalization.

See also
Audiophile
High-end audio
High fidelity
Fidelity
Valve audio amplifiers

Sources

 Queen's University ENPH333 Notes- Prof. J.L. Mason

References

Audio amplifiers